Amargatitanis (meaning "Amarga giant") is a genus of dicraeosaurid sauropod dinosaur (a type of large, long-necked quadrupedal herbivorous dinosaur) from the Barremian-age (Lower Cretaceous) La Amarga Formation of Neuquén, Argentina.

Classification 
The holotype, MACN PV N53, which was collected in March 1983 by José Fernando Bonaparte, consists of two tail vertebrae, a right ischium, and a partial right hindlimb. Although classified as a titanosaur in the original description, the titanosaur placement of Amargatitanis was subsequently questioned by later authors, who noted that a scapula (MACM PV N34) and six tail vertebrae (MACN PV N51) seen as syntypes of Amargatitanis were found at a different locality than MACN PV N53 and that putative titanosaur characters of the genus were invalid. A 2016 re-evaluation by Pablo Ariel Gallina reclassified Amargatitanis as a dicraeosaurid.

References 

Dicraeosaurids
Early Cretaceous dinosaurs of South America
Aptian life
Barremian life
Cretaceous Argentina
Fossils of Argentina
 
Fossil taxa described in 2007